Commodity chemicals (or bulk commodities or bulk chemicals) are a group of chemicals that are made on a very large scale to satisfy global markets. The average prices of commodity chemicals are regularly published in the chemical trade magazines and web sites such as Chemical Week and ICIS. There have been several studies of the scale and complexity of this market for example in the USA.

Commodity chemicals are a sub-sector of the chemical industry (other sub sectors are fine chemicals, specialty chemicals, inorganic chemicals, petrochemicals, pharmaceuticals, renewable energy (e.g. biofuels) and materials (e.g. biopolymers)) Commodity chemicals are differentiated primarily by the bulk of their manufacture.

Types
Chemical compounds are often classified into two classes, inorganic and organic.

Inorganic chemicals

 aluminium sulfate
 ammonia
 ammonium nitrate
 ammonium sulfate
 carbon black
 chlorine
 diammonium phosphate
 monoammonium phosphate
 hydrochloric acid
 hydrogen fluoride
 hydrogen peroxide
 nitric acid
 oxygen
 phosphoric acid
 sodium carbonate
 sodium chlorate
 sodium hydroxide
 sodium silicate
 sulfuric acid
 titanium dioxide

Organic chemicals 
Commonly traded commodity organic chemicals include:

 acetic acid 
 acetone 
 acrylic acid
 acrylonitrile 
 adipic acid 
 benzene 
 butadiene
 butanol
 caprolactam 
 cumene
 cyclohexane
 dioctyl phthalate
 ethanol
 ethylene 
 ethylene oxide  
 ethylene glycol
 formaldehyde
 methanol
 octanol
 phenol 
 phthalic anhydride 
 polypropylene 
 polystyrene 
 polyvinyl chloride 
 propylene
 polypropylene glycol
 propylene oxide
 styrene 
 terephthalic acid
 toluene 
 toluene diisocyanate
 urea 
 vinyl chloride
 xylenes

Sectors
Commodity chemicals are produced to supply diverse but usually well-defined industrial needs.  Some major sectors and their components are:
plastics, synthetic fibers, synthetic rubber
dyes, pigments, paints, coatings
fertilizers, agricultural chemicals, pesticides
cosmetics, soaps, cleaning agent, detergents
pharmaceuticals
mining

See also
Speciality chemicals
Fine chemicals
Chemical industry
Petrochemical
Chemical plant
Organic chemistry
Commercial classification of chemicals

References

External links

 
Chemicals